Stolen Love may refer to:

Stolen Love (film), 1928
Stolen Love (2001 film), Hong Kong film directed by Alan Mak
Agawin Mo Man Ang Lahat (Stolen Love), 2006 Philippine drama television series
"Stolen Love", hit song by Eddy Howard 1952, US No.11
"Stolen Love", Paul Haig song from Rhythm of Life 1983
Stolen Love, album by Red Clay Ramblers  1975